Avraham Ofek (August 14, 1935 – January 13, 1990) was a multidisciplinary Israeli artist.

Biography

Avraham Ofek was born in Burgas, Bulgaria. Within two years of the establishment of the State of Israel in 1948, 45000 of Bulgaria’s 50000 Jews left voluntarily for Israel, including fourteen-year-old Avraham Ofek.  Ofek’s birth parents died prior to this, and he emigrated with an adoptive family. Ofek's adoptive status remained unknown to him until his twenties. They settled in Kibbutz Ein HaMifratz. Informally, Ofek studied painting under his neighbour, Aryeh Rothman. 

In 1952, Ofek's adoptive father passed away. Two years later, Ofek enlisted in the Nahal Brigade of the Israel Defense Forces.

In 1958 he went to Italy to continue his studies and to participate in the mural on a wall of the Accademia di Belle Arti in Florence. Under the spell of the art of mural painting, which Ofek considered the primary medium of his work, he painted several of his best-known works, such as the mural on the wall of Beit Haam in Kfar Uria (1970), the mural in the Central Post Office in Jerusalem (1972) and the mural 'Israel, a Shattered Dream', at Haifa University (1986–1987). 

Upon returning to Israel in 1962, Efrat, his eldest daughter, was born in Kibbutz Ein Hamifratz. The family shortly moved to Jerusalem, and in 1966 began teaching at the Bezalel Academy.  

In 1963, Ofek served as one of the coffin-bearers at the funeral of Yitzhak Ben-Zvi, the second president of Israel. 

In 1977, Ofek began studying at Yeshiva Mercaz HaRav.

Artistic style
Avraham Ofek's early works were traditional landscapes, in a distinctly hybrid style that is particular to Middle Eastern, Jewish art. Later in his career, landscapes became undefined and receded into the background. Towards the end of Ofek's life, the landscape of Jerusalem became an important motif, reflecting loss and despair. Many of Ofek's landscapes convey a sense of alienation and solitude, as well as nostalgia for the city of his birth, Sofia.

In 1957 his first solo exhibition was held at the Acre Museum. Following the exhibition, Ofek was invited to exhibit in the prestigious exhibition hall of the Bezalel Academy of Art and Design. Most of his works in these years and until the early 1960s are made of gouache and tempera on paper. Iconographically, the paintings are characterised by the use of concrete images such as cows, agricultural machinery and landscapes of the country, painted using dark coloration that differs from earlier attempts to reflect the "light of the Land of Israel". Ofek's works included images of Arab workers and slums, which he painted during his visits to Haifa, Acre and Jaffa.

During the late 1960s and throughout the 1970s he was an active member of the Leviathan Group, with the artists Shmuel Ackerman and Mikhail Grobman. The group, which was founded in 1976, combined symbolism, metaphysics, Judaism and conceptual and environmental art. Within the framework of this group Ofek created performances and symbolic activities into which Jewish traditional symbolism was integrated.

From the 1980s onward, Ofek returned to more traditional painting, which continued to feature Jewish themes, Israeli landscapes, and views of his city, Jerusalem.

In 1989, the Jerusalem Print Workshop issued a collection of reproductions of his prints edited by Uri Katz, with text in Hebrew and English.

Education
 -1958: Under the tutelage of Aryeh Rothman
 1958–1960: Academy of Fine Arts, Florence
 1961: Study Tour to Seville and Madrid, Spain, and London
 1969: Study Tour to Europe and U.S.A.

Teaching
 1965–1975: Bezalel Academy, Jerusalem
 1975: Head of the Television Broadcasting Art Department, Jerusalem
 1978–1981: Art Department, Haifa University
 1984–1990: Professor, Art Department, Haifa University

Prizes
 1959: America-Israel Cultural Foundation
 1969: Jerusalem Prize for painting and Sculpture
 1990: Ish-Shalom Prize for Life's Work in Art

Outdoor and Public Art
 1970, mural, Beit Haam, Kfar Uria
 1972, mural, Central Post Office, Jerusalem
 1973, mural, Agron School, Jerusalem
 1974, 'Mountains About Jerusalem', mural, Stone School, Jerusalem
 1976, 'Return to Zion', mural, Tel Aviv University Library, Tel Aviv
 1982, 'Hailek Ben Shachar', stone sculpture, Gan Harakevet, Arlozorof Street, Tel Aviv-Yafo
 1986, 'Homage to Asher', 1966 stone sculpture, Tefen Open University, Tefen
 1986–1987,  'Israel, A Shattered Dream', mural, Haifa University, Haifa
 1987, stone sculpture, Tel Aviv Museum of Art, Tel Aviv, Israel
 2000, [relocation] Binding of Isaac (1986), stone sculpture, Gan Daniel, Safra Square, Jerusalem

Selected exhibitions
Exhibition of gouache paintings and drawings by Avraham Ofek, The Municipal Museum, Acre, 1957 
 Avraham Ofek – Solo exhibition, Dugith Art Gallery, Tel Aviv, 1964 
 Avraham Ofek: Paintings, The Bezalel National Museum, Jerusalem, 21 December, 1957 – 15 January, 1958 
Retrospective – Works 1956–1986, Museum of Art, Ein Harod, 3 May, 1986 – 3 June, 1986 
Prints and Miniature Sculpture by Avraham Ofek – On the Occasion of the First Anniversary of his Death, Yad Labanim Museum, Petach-Tikva, 9 February, 1991 – 16 March, 1991 
Night's Final Watch, Avraham Ofek: The Last Gouache Work, University of Haifa, Faculty of Humanities, The Art Gallery, Haifa, 12 March, 1991 – 12 April, 1991
Landscape of Longing: Avraham Ofek's Early and Late Works, Israel Museum, Jerusalem, 15 March, 2007 – 23 June, 2007 
Avraham Ofek: Body, Work, Joseph and Rebecca Meyerhoff Pavilion, Main Building, Tel Aviv Museum of Art, Tel Aviv, 31 May, 2018 – 20 October, 2018

Gallery

References

 Jewish Museum, Avraham Ofek, New York, The Jewish Museum, 1973.
 Kampf, Avraham, Avraham Ofek – Murals, University of Haifa, 1987.
 Mendelsohn, Amitai, Landscape of Longing: Avraham Ofek's Early and Late Works, Jerusalem, The Israel Museum, 2007.
 Ofrat, Gideon Sifriat Poalim, Home – Avraham Ofek: Works 1956 – 1986, Tel-Aviv, 1986.
 Ronen, Avraham, Avraham Ofek, Tel Aviv, Hakibbutz Hameuhad, 1989.

External links
 
 
 

1935 births
1990 deaths
Bulgarian Jews in Israel
Bulgarian emigrants to Israel
Israeli people of Bulgarian-Jewish descent
Israeli adoptees
20th-century Israeli male artists
Jewish Israeli artists
People from Burgas